Dalton City can refer to the following:
Dalton City, Illinois
Dalton City (Lucky Luke), a Lucky Luke comic